Vadonia is a species of beetle in the family Cerambycidae.

Species
The following species are recognised in the genus Vadonia:
Vadonia bicolor (Redtenbacher, 1850)
Vadonia bipunctata (Fabricius, 1781)
Vadonia bittisiensis Chevrolat, 1882
Vadonia bolognai Sama, 1982
Vadonia ciliciensis (K.Daniel & J.Daniel, 1891)
Vadonia danielorum Holzschuh, 1984
Vadonia dojranensis Holzschuh, 1984
Vadonia frater Holzschuh, 1981
Vadonia grandicollis Mulsant & Rey, 1863
Vadonia gusmii Pesarini & Sabbadini, 2009
Vadonia hirsuta (K.Daniel & J.Daniel, 1891)
Vadonia imitatrix (K.Daniel & J.Daniel, 1891)
Vadonia insidiosa Holzschuh, 1984
Vadonia ispirensis Holzschuh, 1993
Vadonia instigmata Pic, 1889
Vadonia mainoldii Pesarini & Sabbadini, 2004
Vadonia moesiaca (K.Daniel & J.Daniel, 1891)
Vadonia monostigma Ganglbauer, 1882
Vadonia parnassensis (Pic, 1925)
Vadonia soror Holzschuh, 1981
Vadonia unipunctata (Fabricius, 1787)
Vadonia vartanisi Danilevsky, 2014]

References

Lepturinae